Kopp's Kove is a hamlet in the Canadian province of Saskatchewan. It is on the western shore at the south end of Turtle Lake, west of Prince Albert and northwest of Saskatoon.

Demographics 

References

Designated places in Saskatchewan
Mervin No. 499, Saskatchewan
Organized hamlets in Saskatchewan
Division No. 17, Saskatchewan